Chernyaevo is a rural locality (a selo) and the administrative center of Chernyaevsky Selsoviet of Magdagachinsky District, Amur Oblast, Russia. The population was 406 as of 2018. There are 17 streets.

Geography 
Chernyaevo is located on the left bank of the Amur River, 120 km south of Magdagachi (the district's administrative centre) by road.

References 

Rural localities in Magdagachinsky District